Anatoly Rykov is a Russian art and political theorist, art historian, and professor at the Saint Petersburg State University. In his numerous writings Professor Rykov argues that leftist projects in art and culture often employ repressive and totalitarian concepts and metaphors. He introduced the notion of “radical conservatism” in order to explain this phenomenon in the theoretical matrix of the avant-garde and its postmodern interpretation. An expert on both Russian and Western art history and theory, he has written on a range of subjects in the Renaissance, 18th, 19th and 20th Century art. In his award-winning book, Postmodernism as radical conservatism (2007), he analyses the connotations of right-wing politics and philosophy in the work of eminent representatives of American art theory. His other publications include Marxism and Loneliness (On the “Political Unconscious” of the Contemporary Humanities in the West, Foundations of Art Theory (2007), Origins of the avant-garde (2016), and Formalism: Sociology of art (2016). His current research project Russian Art Theory: between Fascism and Shamanism concerns the issues of convergence between different political and sacral discourses in Russian twentieth-century theories of art.

Works
Постмодернизм как "радикальный консерватизм" : проблема художественно-теоретического консерватизма и американская теория современного искусства, 1960-1990-х гг. [Postmodernism as "radical conservatism"] (2007), Sankt-Peterburg: Aleteia, 
 "Politics of Avant-Garde". Moscow, 2019
 Rykov A. Between a Conservative Revolution and Bolshevism: Nikolai Punin’s Total Aesthetic Mobilization. Russian Studies in Literature, vol. 53, no. 2, 2017, pp. 147-171, DOI: 10.1080/10611975.2017.1400270
 Rykov A. V. Absent Look. Edouard Manet and Timothy Clark’s Theory of Modernism. Вестник Санкт-Петербургского университета. Искусствоведение, 10(2), 266-273.

References

 Nakoneczny T. Postmodernism - A New Russian Interpretation (Book review: A.V. Rykov, Postmodernism kak "radikalnyj konservatizm. Problema chudožestvenno-teoretičeskogo konservatizma and amerikanskaja teorija sovremennogo iskusstwa 1960-1990-ch godov. Sankt-Petersburg 2007, 376 pp.) // Comparisons. Journal of comparative literature and interdisciplinary studies. No. 5, Poznan, Laboratory of Comparative Literature IFP AMU (Adam Mickiewicz University), 2008. P. 245–248. PRACOWNIA KOMPARATYSTYKI LITERACKIEJ - NUMER 5/2008
 Nakoneczny T. Postmodernizm – nowe rosyjskie odczytanie (A. V. Rykov, Postmodernizm kak „radikalnyj konservatizm”) // Porownania 5/2008 Repozytorium Uniwersytetu im. Adama Mickiewicza (AMUR): Przeszukiwanie AMUR

External links 
Profile at St Petersburg University
 http://scjournal.ru/articles/issn_1997-292X_2017_3-2_36.pdf 

Year of birth missing (living people)
Living people
Russian philosophers
Russian avant-garde
21st-century Russian historians
Academic staff of Saint Petersburg State University
Sociologists of art